For a trade union organization of workers, the Workmen's Compensation (Accidents) Convention, 1925 is  an International Labour Organization Convention.

It was established in 1925:
Having decided upon the adoption of certain proposals with regard to workmen's compensation for accidents, ...

Modification 
The Convention was subsequently revised in 1964 by Convention C121 - Employment Injury Benefits Convention, 1964.

Ratifications
As of 2013, the convention has been ratified by 74 states. Three states—Chile, Sweden, and Uruguay—have subsequently denounced the convention.

References

External links 
Text.
Ratifications.

Workmen's
Occupational safety and health treaties
Treaties concluded in 1925
Treaties entered into force in 1927
Treaties of the People's Republic of Angola
Treaties of Algeria
Treaties of Antigua and Barbuda
Treaties of Argentina
Treaties of Armenia
Treaties of the First Austrian Republic
Treaties of the Bahamas
Treaties of Barbados
Treaties of Belgium
Treaties of Bolivia
Treaties of Bosnia and Herzegovina
Treaties of the Kingdom of Bulgaria
Treaties of Burkina Faso
Treaties of Burundi
Treaties of Cape Verde
Treaties of the Central African Republic
Treaties of Colombia
Treaties of the Comoros
Treaties of Croatia
Treaties of Cuba
Treaties of Czechoslovakia
Treaties of the Czech Republic
Treaties of the Republic of the Congo (Léopoldville)
Treaties of Djibouti
Treaties of the United Arab Republic
Treaties of Finland
Treaties of the French Fourth Republic
Treaties of West Germany
Treaties of the Kingdom of Greece
Treaties of Guinea
Treaties of Guinea-Bissau
Treaties of Haiti
Treaties of the Kingdom of Hungary (1920–1946)
Treaties of the Iraqi Republic (1958–1968)
Treaties of Kenya
Treaties of Kyrgyzstan
Treaties of Latvia
Treaties of Lebanon
Treaties of Luxembourg
Treaties of the Federation of Malaya
Treaties of Mali
Treaties of Mauritania
Treaties of Mauritius
Treaties of Mexico
Treaties of Montenegro
Treaties of Morocco
Treaties of the People's Republic of Mozambique
Treaties of Myanmar
Treaties of the Netherlands
Treaties of New Zealand
Treaties of Nicaragua
Treaties of Panama
Treaties of the Philippines
Treaties of the Second Polish Republic
Treaties of the Ditadura Nacional
Treaties of Rwanda
Treaties of Saint Lucia
Treaties of São Tomé and Príncipe
Treaties of Serbia and Montenegro
Treaties of Sierra Leone
Treaties of Slovakia
Treaties of Slovenia
Treaties of the Somali Republic
Treaties of Spain under the Restoration
Treaties of Suriname
Treaties of Tanganyika
Treaties of North Macedonia
Treaties of Tunisia
Treaties of the United Kingdom
Treaties of Uganda
Treaties of Zambia
Treaties of Yugoslavia
Treaties extended to Surinam (Dutch colony)
Treaties extended to Curaçao and Dependencies
Treaties extended to the Belgian Congo
Treaties extended to Ruanda-Urundi
Treaties extended to French Guiana
Treaties extended to Guadeloupe
Treaties extended to Martinique
Treaties extended to Réunion
Treaties extended to the Colony of Barbados
Treaties extended to British Honduras
Treaties extended to Bermuda
Treaties extended to the Colony of North Borneo
Treaties extended to the British Virgin Islands
Treaties extended to British Dominica
Treaties extended to the Falkland Islands
Treaties extended to Gibraltar
Treaties extended to Guernsey
Treaties extended to Jersey
Treaties extended to the Gilbert and Ellice Islands
Treaties extended to the Isle of Man
Treaties extended to Saint Helena, Ascension and Tristan da Cunha
Treaties extended to British Saint Lucia
Treaties extended to British Saint Vincent and the Grenadines
Treaties extended to the Colony of Sarawak
Treaties extended to the Colony of Sierra Leone
Treaties extended to the British Solomon Islands
Treaties extended to Swaziland (protectorate)
Treaties extended to the Uganda Protectorate
1925 in labor relations